The men's marathon event at the 1991 Summer Universiade was held at the streets of Sheffield on 21 July 1991.

Results

References

Athletics at the 1991 Summer Universiade
1991